The fourteenth season of the Bleach anime series is based on Tite Kubo's Bleach manga series. The season concludes the fight between the Soul Reapers and Sōsuke Aizen's arrancar army as the former defends Karakura Town from the latter's invasion, while Ichigo and his group fight the arrancars in Hueco Mundo to rescue Orihime Inoue.

The season aired from April 2010 to 2011. Aniplex collected it in eleven DVD volumes between February 23 and December 14, 2011. The English adaptation of the Bleach anime is licensed by Viz Media, and this season started airing on Adult Swim's Toonami programming block on August 12, 2012, and ended on September 29, 2013.

The episodes uses six pieces of theme music: two opening themes and four closing themes. The first opening theme, "chAngE" by Miwa is used for episodes 266 to 291, while the second opening theme,  by Sid is used from episode 292 to 316. The first ending theme, "Stay Beautiful" by Diggy-Mo is used for episodes 266 to 278, the second ending theme, "echoes" by Universe is used from episode 279 to 291, the third ending theme, "Last Moment" by SPYAIR is used from episode 292 to 303, and the fourth ending theme "Song For..." by ROOKiEZ is PUNK'D is used from episode 304 to 316.


Episode list

References
General

Specific

2010 Japanese television seasons
2011 Japanese television seasons
Season 14